Trușeni is a commune in Chișinău Municipality, Moldova. It had a population of 7,952 at the 2004 Moldovan Census, and is a northwest suburb of the city. The commune is composed of two villages, Dumbrava (population 406) and Trușeni (population 7,546).

Notable people
 Constantin Cheianu
 Maria Codreanu
 Irina Madan
 Gheorghe Vasile Madan

Demography

Ethnic groups
According to Census of Population from 2004 (Republic of Moldova):

References

Communes of Chișinău Municipality